Comfort You may refer to:

"Comfort You", song by Van Morrison from Veedon Fleece 1974  
"Comfort You", song by Cyndi Lauper from Shine (Cyndi Lauper album)
"Comfort You", song by Eskimo Joe from Black Fingernails, Red Wine 2006
"Comfort You", song by Letters from the Fire from Letters from the Fire (album)